Eva Flyvholm (born 18 April 1981 in Nykøbing Falster) is a Danish politician, who is a member of the Folketing for the Red-Green Alliance political party. She was elected into parliament at the 2015 Danish general election.

Political career
Flyvholm was elected into parliament in the 2015 election, receiving 2,651 votes. She was elected again in 2019 with 3,740	votes.

References

External links 
 Biography on the website of the Danish Parliament (Folketinget)

Living people
1981 births
People from Guldborgsund Municipality
21st-century Danish women politicians
Women members of the Folketing
Red–Green Alliance (Denmark) politicians
Members of the Folketing 2015–2019
Members of the Folketing 2019–2022
20th-century Danish women